The greyish-crowned leafbird (Chloropsis lazulina) is a bird native to southern China south to Vietnam. The subspecies melliana is the one found throughout most of the range, while the nominate subspecies lazulina is endemic to Hainan Island. The orange-bellied leafbird (C. hardwickii), which ranges from the Himalayas to northern Laos and the Malay Peninsula, was formerly considered conspecific.

References

greyish-crowned leafbird
Birds of Indochina
Birds of Vietnam
Birds of Laos
Birds of Cambodia
Birds of South China
greyish-crowned leafbird
greyish-crowned leafbird